The 1931 Summer Deaflympics officially known as the 3rd Summer Deaflympics (3rd International Silent Games) was an international multi-sport event that was held from 19 August 1931 to 23 August 1931. It was hosted by Nürnberg, Germany.

The 3rd Summer Deaflympics Games were originally scheduled to be held in 1932, but was decided to host it in 1931 due to the schedule of 1932 Summer Olympics.

Participating Countries
The countries who participated in the games were:
 Austria
 Belgium
 Czechoslovakia
 Denmark
 Finland
 France
 Germany
 Great Britain
 Hungary
 Italy
 Netherlands
 Norway
 Sweden
 Switzerland

Poland were not allowed to participate at the Games due to Germany's conflict with Poland during the Nazi rule at that time as the Games held in Germany.

Sports
The following events were included in the 1931 Deaflympics:

Individual sports 

  Athletics  
  Road cycling
  Diving
  Shooting
  Swimming
  Tennis

Team sports 
  Football

Medal table

Results

Athletics

Cycling

Diving

Football

Shooting

Swimming

Tennis

Notes

References 

Deaflympics
1931 in German sport
International sports competitions hosted by Germany
August 1931 sports events
1931 in multi-sport events
Multi-sport events in Germany
Parasports in Germany